This is a list of alleged sightings of unidentified flying objects or UFOs in Spain.

1976 
 At dawn on November 12, 1976, two soldiers (José María Trejo and Juan Carrizosa Luján), claimed to have seen and shot at a being of unknown origin at the Base Aérea de Talavera la Real (Talavera la Real Air Base), located in the Spanish province of Badajoz. Both were on patrol at 1:45 am, when they heard a noise similar to radio interference which later became an acute whistle. When it ceased five minutes later, they spotted an intense bright light in the sky, that lasted 15 seconds. Another guard arrived with a guard dog and all began searching around the area. Eventually, they heard the sound of eucalyptus twigs being broken. The dog was released and rushed to the place where the noise was coming from, but returned sick, a process which was repeated a couple of times. Eventually, the dog started to circle them, (a technique meant to protect guard dogs' handlers). Trejo then allegedly spotted a human-shaped green light to his left. The being was about 3 meters tall. It seemed to be formed of small light points, and the brightness was more intense along its edges. The head was small and covered by something resembling a helmet. The arms were very long and had no apparent hands or feet. Trejo fainted; after which his colleagues opened fire at the creature. 40 to 50 bullets were fired, but the being simply disappeared. While Trejo was being assisted, the same sound as before was heard. The next morning, 50 men searched the whole area but found no bullet casings or bullet holes. However, the Air Force concluded that the soldiers did fire their guns. Spanish Army veteran Vicente Juan believes the soldiers suffered nothing but a hallucination strengthened by fear and confusion.

1979 

 The Manises UFO Incident took place on 11 November 1979, forcing a commercial flight to make an emergency landing at the Manises airport in Valencia, Spain.

1994 
 On January 18 a Tunguska-like event occurred at Cando in Galicia, Spain.

See also 
 List of major UFO sightings
 UFO sightings in the Canary Islands

References

External links 
 MUFON - Last 20 UFO Sightings and Pictures

Spain
Historical events in Spain